, known as "Boss", is a Japanese drift driver.

He first became a pro driver at the age of 18, racing Honda Civics in the Civic and Mirage race divisions in Japan. He set track records at the Suzuka track in Japan which stood for a number of years.  
At 20 he opened a tuning shop called Garage-S to focus on the technical side of race tuning, and would later become more widely known after establishing himself in the Japan Drift and tuning scene. 
From the mid-1990s onwards he focused his time tuning and racing the SR20DET powered Nissan S13 180SX and Nissan Skyline GTS-t SR20DET or RB20DET powered versions, as well developing his own line of aero body kits and sportswear line.

Seigo Yamamoto is currently racing a Toyota Chaser with an OS Giken built KA24DE powered in the 2006 Formula D series. 
Falken Tires, OS Giken, K&N, Wise Sports, Sparco, Tein, Garage-S and Skye Service SPL are current sponsors.

Complete Drifting Results

D1 Grand Prix

Formula D

References

External links
 Company Site
D1 Supporter profile
Formula D profile

1971 births
Drifting drivers
D1 Grand Prix drivers
Japanese racing drivers
Living people
Formula D drivers